Viasat 1 was a Ghanaian television channel owned by the Swedish listed media group, Modern Times Group (MTG). It was replaced by Kwesé Sports in 2016.

The channel was awarded a licence from the National Communications Authority of the Republic of Ghana in December 2007 and started broadcasting on December 12, 2008, on 6 p.m. The first programme on the channel was the movie Duma, followed by The Cosby Show, Friends and CSI: Crime Scene Investigation.

Viasat 1 was MTG's first venture in Africa and became the fifth terrestrial television network in Ghana after GTV, Metro TV, TV3 and TV Africa.

Ownership 
In December 2016, MTG sold African business (Viasat 1 (Ghana), TV1 (Tanzania) and Modern African Production (MAP)) to Econet Wireless.

Programs
Before the channel was sold Viasat 1 broadcast the following programs:

Series
 CSI: Crime Scene Investigation
 CSI: NY
 CSI: Miami
 Ghost Whisperer
 The Firm
 Grey's Anatomy
 The Walking Dead
 NCIS: Los Angeles
 Bones
 Charmed(TV series)

Kids
 Pula and Friends
 Magic Cellar
 Tales from Africa
 Action Man
 Supa Strikas
 X-Men
 Gormiti
 Oscar's Oasis
 Kassai and Luk
 Men in Black
 Bernard
 Dex Hamilton: Alien Entomologist
 Hannah Montana
Tingatinga
Bob the builder
Handy Mandy

Talk shows 
 The Oprah Winfrey Show
 The One Show
 This Morning
 Boys Boys

Game shows 
 It Runs in the Family

Sitcoms 
 Friends
 The Bernie Mac Show
 Girlfriends
 The Game
 Everybody Hates Chris
 Pair of Kings
Two and a half men

Drama 
 Generations
 The Lab
 Jozi
 Hard Copy
 Tinsel
 Los Querendones
 Grey's Anatomy
 Tormenta en el paraiso
 Pasión de Gavilanes
 Eva Luna
 Soy tu dueña
 La que no podia amar
 Alma Indomable
 En Nombre del Amor
 Un Refugio para el Amor
 Dahil May Isang Ikaw
 Sa Piling Mo
 Una Maid en Manhattan
 Sacrificio de Mujer

Reality shows 
 America's Next Top Model
 Born star

Lifestyle 
 Studio 53
 Mzanzi Ridez
 Dance Africa
 Catwalk Kenya

Sports 
 The World Game
 Sport Science
 Premier League
 Sports Xtra
 Serie A
 Football 360

References

External links
 Viasat 1 Blog

Broadcasting in Ghana
Modern Times Group
Mass media in Accra
Television channels and stations established in 2007